Koharu (written: 小春 or コハル in katakana) is a feminine Japanese given name. Notable people with the name include:

, Japanese idol, singer, model, actress, voice actress and television personality
, Japanese manga artist
 , Japanese choreographer and model
, Japanese badminton player

Japanese feminine given names